Gypsy Honeymoon: The Best of Kim Carnes is a compilation album by American singer-songwriter Kim Carnes, released on February 9, 1993 by EMI. It contains some of Carnes' hit singles, some album tracks and three new recordings. The three duets with Kenny Rogers, Barbra Streisand and Gene Cotton had never appeared on an album by Carnes before this release.

The title track was released as a single in 1993 and reached no. 65 in Germany.

Background 
Carnes noted that Gypsy Honeymoon is "a best-of, not a greatest hits", including some of Carnes' personal favourites and tracks requested by her fans. Gypsy Honeymoon featured two brand new tracks, "Chain Letter" and "Don't Cry Now", and a re-recording of the title track which originally appeared on Carnes' previous studio album Checkin' Out the Ghosts (1991), released exclusively in Japan. Carnes stated that she was so proud of the track that she wanted to re-record it so that it could reach a wider audience. "Gypsy Honeymoon" was released as the lead single and it peaked at no. 65 on the German Top 100 Singles chart. In 2002, Carnes provided backing vocals for a version of "Gypsy Honeymoon" recorded by Collin Raye on his album Can't Back Down (2002). "Don't Cry Now" was remixed and released as a promotional single later in 1993.

On March 4, 1994, Michelle Wright performed "Gypsy Honeymoon" at the St. Joseph Civic Arena in Missouri as a tribute to John Candy, who passed away earlier that day.

Critical reception 

Writing for The Tampa Tribune, Michael Dunn described Gypsy Honeymoon as "a bright 'hello' and a good buy", noting that Carnes has "an ear for good tunes and a stylish vocal delivery". In The Morning Call, Larry Printz observed that the album is missing a number of her Top 40 hits, with the compilation instead acting as "a portrait of a smart singer-songwriter" with numerous album tracks. He complimented the three new songs, opining that they promise "more great work from Carnes in the 90s". The Calgary Herald complimented Gypsy Honeymoon on its inclusion of hits "More Love", "Crazy in the Night (Barking at Airplanes)" and "Bette Davis Eyes", but opined that Carnes' voice "starts to wear thin" over time.

In a retrospective review, Stephen Thomas Erlewine of AllMusic described Gypsy Honeymoon as "a fairly satisfying collection for most casual fans", noting the absence of "Draw of the Cards" and "Voyeur".

Track listing

Personnel 
Credits for tracks 1–3 adapted from liner notes.

Musicians 
Kim Carnes – lead vocals , backing vocals 
Don Dixon – production , bass , backing vocals , harmony vocals 
Steve Goldstein – keys 
Tim Pierce – electric guitar , EBow 
Steven Soles – acoustic guitar , mandolin 
Denny Fongheiser – drums 
Jim Brock – percussion 
Andrea Robinson – backing vocals 
Maxine Waters Willard – backing vocals 
Julia Tillman Waters – backing vocals

Technical
Peter Doell – engineering
Richard Bosworth – vocal engineering
Eric Rudd – assistant engineering
Dan Bosworth – assistant engineering
Lori Gillman – production assistant
Don Dixon – mixing
Mark Williams – mixing
Paul Lani – remixing

Design
Henry Marquez – art direction
Loren Hanes – photography
Diane Cuddy – design
Mark Cozza – hand lettering
George Newell – makeup
Kathy Blizzard – hair stylist

References

Kim Carnes albums
1993 greatest hits albums
Capitol Records compilation albums